Lewis Island may refer to:

Canada
Lewis Island (British Columbia), an island near the mouth of the Skeena River on the North Coast of British Columbia
Crease Island, British Columbia, was formerly known as Lewis Island
Lewis Island (Nova Scotia), an island in Inverness County, Nova Scotia
Lewis Island (Algoma), an island in the Algoma District of Ontario
Lewis Island (Leeds County), an island in Leeds County, Ontario
Lewis Island (Manitoba), an island in Manitoba
Lewis Islands, Newfoundland and Labrador, in the Terra Nova Peninsula region
Lewis Island (Newfoundland and Labrador), one of four islands in that province
Lewis Island Tickle, a channel in Newfoundland and Labrador

United States
Lewis Island (Connecticut), off the shore of the state of Connecticut
Lewis Island (Georgia)

Elsewhere
Lewis Island (Antarctica)
Lewis Island (South Australia)
West Lewis Island (Dampier Archipelago, Western Australia)
East Lewis Island (Dampier Archipelago, Western Australia)
Isle of Lewis, a peninsula in the Outer Hebrides, Scotland
Lewis and Harris, Outer Hebrides, the largest island in Scotland